Tamás Juhár (born 20 November 1972) is a former Hungarian international defender.
He started his career as a trainee in the Budapest Football club of Vasas SC. In the season 2002/03, he went to another Budapest side Újpest FC following the relegation of Vasas SC in the Hungarian second division (NB2) and secondly due to his regular selection in the Hungarian national team during that period. He joined Nea Salamis Famagusta FC in 2005, and after 2 and half seasons he returned to Hungary, joining the squad of Újpest FC for the second time.

References
Retrieved from "http://www.ujpestfc.hu" 31.12.2004

External links

1972 births
Living people
People from Sátoraljaújhely
Hungarian footballers
Hungary international footballers
Hungarian expatriate footballers
Vasas SC players
Újpest FC players
Nea Salamis Famagusta FC players
Cypriot First Division players
Expatriate footballers in Cyprus
Association football defenders
Sportspeople from Borsod-Abaúj-Zemplén County